Devon Park may refer to:
 Devon Park, South Australia, a suburb of Adelaide
 Devon Park, Queensland in the Toowoomba Region
 a suburb of Stellenbosch in South Africa